The 2010 United States Senate election in Georgia took place on November 2, 2010. Incumbent Republican U.S. Senator Johnny Isakson won re-election to a second term.

Democratic primary

Candidates 

 Mike Thurmond, Commissioner of Labor
 RJ Hadley, chief of staff to the Rockdale County Commission

Polling

Results

Republican primary

Candidates 

 Johnny Isakson, incumbent Class III U.S. Senator

Results

General election

Candidates 
 Chuck Donovan (L), airline pilot
 Johnny Isakson (R), incumbent Class III U.S. Senator
 Mike Thurmond (D), Commissioner of Labor

Campaign 
Thurmond was the underdog in trying to become the first African-American to serve Georgia in the U.S. Senate. Thurmond claimed "Polls are irrelevant. As everyone knows, the only poll that counts is the election on November 2." Isakson defended his record saying "Big business is not evil. If you didn't have big business, you wouldn't have jobs in America today." Despite the fact all political prognosticators classified the race as being safe for Isakson by August 20, he stated that Thurmond was a potentially formidable candidate, and that he would take nothing for granted.

Debates 
 October 24

Predictions

Polling 

* Note: There is only one "other" candidate: Chuck Donovan.

Fundraising

Results

See also 

 List of United States senators from Georgia

References

External links 
 Elections Division of the Georgia Secretary of State
 U.S. Congress candidates for Georgia at Project Vote Smart
 Georgia U.S. Senate from OurCampaigns.com
 Campaign contributions from Open Secrets
 2010 Georgia Senate General Election: Sen. Johnny Isakson (R) vs Michael Thurmond (D) graph of multiple polls from Pollster.com
 Election 2010: Georgia Senate from Rasmussen Reports
 2010 Georgia Senate Race from Real Clear Politics
 2010 Georgia Senate Race from CQ Politics
 Race profile from The New York Times
Official campaign websites (Archived)
 Chuck Donovan for U.S. Senate
 RJ Hadley for U.S. Senate
 Johnny Isakson for U.S. Senate incumbent
 Mike Thurmond for U.S. Senate

2010 Georgia (U.S. state) elections
Georgia
2010